Ghoussoub is a surname. Notable people with the surname include: 

Mai Ghoussoub (1952–2007), Lebanese writer
Nassif Ghoussoub (born 1953), Canadian mathematician